Gert Port (born 23 July 1968) is an Austrian rower. He competed in the men's quadruple sculls event at the 1992 Summer Olympics.

References

External links
 

1968 births
Living people
Austrian male rowers
Olympic rowers of Austria
Rowers at the 1992 Summer Olympics
Sportspeople from Klagenfurt